Zgon  is a village in the administrative district of Gmina Piecki, within Mrągowo County, Warmian-Masurian Voivodeship, in northern Poland. The village lies on national road 58.

Zgon had a population of 137 in 2011. Close to the village, there is the bird sanctuary "Czaplisko-Lawny Lasek" (Little Wood with Herons) and the following landmarks: the "Royal Pine Tree", "The Lake Mokre Shore Oak" (Wet Lake) and the "Lovers Couple", two nested trees, that is an oak whose branches enclose a pine.

Notable residents
 Max Pruss (1891-1960), Captain of LZ 129 Hindenburg
 Erich Rudnick (1916-1988), Wehrmacht officer

References

Zgon